La poliziotta (internationally released as Policewoman) is a 1974 Italian comedy film directed by Steno. For this film Mariangela Melato was awarded with a David di Donatello for Best Actress.

Plot 
In Milan, the young policewoman Gianna discovers an ecological scandal involving an honorable local deputy, and has to face the hypocrisy and the corruption which plague the police and the society of the time.

Cast 
Mariangela Melato as Giovanna 'Gianna' Abbastanzi
 Orazio Orlando as Magistrate Ruggero Patanè
 Mario Carotenuto as Police Chief Marcellini
Renato Pozzetto as  Claudio Ravassi
Alberto Lionello as  Tarcisio Monti
 Armando Brancia as  Senator Giuseppe Brembani
 Renato Scarpa as Pharmacist Camillotti
 Gianfranco Barra as Dr. Gargiulo
 Umberto Smaila as  Son of the Mayor
Alvaro Vitali as  Fantuzzi
 Pia Velsi as  Giovanna's mother

See also     
 List of Italian films of 1974

References

External links

1974 films
1970s police comedy films
Commedia all'italiana
Films directed by Stefano Vanzina
1974 comedy films
Poliziotta films
Films with screenplays by Sergio Donati
Films with screenplays by Luciano Vincenzoni
Films set in Milan
Films scored by Gianni Ferrio
1970s Italian films